Lineolaria is a genus of hydrozoans belonging to the family Lineolariidae.

The species of this genus are found in Southern Australia and New Zealand.

Species:

Lineolaria flexuosa 
Lineolaria spinulosa

References

Lineolariidae
Hydrozoan genera